Shimbay district (Karakalpak: Шымбай районы, Shimbay rayonı) is a district of the Republic of Karakalpakstan. The capital lies at the city Shimbay. In 2019, part of its territory was given to the re-established Bozataw district.

Shimbay district contains one city Shimbay, one town Áyteke and ten rural communities.

References

Karakalpakstan
Districts of Uzbekistan